Hemmatabad-e Chalaki (also Romanized as Hemmatābād-e Chālāḵī) is a village in Shirin Darreh Rural District, in the Central District of Quchan County, Razavi Khorasan Province, Iran. At the 2006 census, its population was 130, in 41 families.

References 

Populated places in Quchan County